Morristown Schoolhouse is a historic one-room school building located at Morristown in St. Lawrence County, New York.  It was built about 1824 and is a one-story, small rectangular gable roofed limestone building.  It was used as a school until 1877, then was village hall from 1899 and 1910.  In 1976, it was renovated as a schoolhouse museum.

It was listed on the National Register of Historic Places in 1982.

References

School buildings on the National Register of Historic Places in New York (state)
One-room schoolhouses in New York (state)
Schoolhouses in the United States
School buildings completed in 1824
Museums in St. Lawrence County, New York
History museums in New York (state)
Education museums in the United States
National Register of Historic Places in St. Lawrence County, New York